Kuci may refer to:

KUCI, California radio station
Kuči, Region in Montenegro
Kuç (disambiguation), several villages in Albania